Film is a monthly Polish magazine devoted to cinema. It has been in publication since 1946, originally as a bimonthly publication. The founders were Jerzy Giżycki, Zbigniew Pitera, Tadeusz Kowalski and Leon Bukowiecki.

Since September 2012, the editor-in-chief has been Tomasz Raczek. Previous editors have included Maciej Pawlicki, Lech Kurpiewski, Igor Zalewski and Robert Mazurek, Agnieszka Różycka, Marcin Prokop and Jacek Rakowiecki.

In January 2007, Film was purchased by Platforma Mediowa Point Group (PMPG).

Editorial staff
Editor-in-chief – Tomasz Raczek
Assistant editor – Agnieszka Dajbor, Danuta Łosin
Editorial secretary – Agnieszka Niemojewska
Artistic director – Marek Trojanowski
Graphics – Cezary Cichocki, Mariusz Trocewicz
Photography – Dagmara Trocewicz
Team – Elżbieta Ciapara, Agnieszka Koseska, Anita Zuchora, Bartosz Żurawiecki

References

External links
 

1946 establishments in Poland
Film magazines
Magazines published in Poland
Polish-language magazines
Magazines established in 1946
Monthly magazines published in Poland
Bi-monthly magazines